Bilhah ( "unworried", Standard Hebrew: Bilha, Tiberian Hebrew: Bīlhā) is a woman mentioned in the Book of Genesis.  describes her as Laban's handmaid, who was given to Rachel to be her handmaid on Rachel's marriage to Jacob. When Rachel failed to have children, Rachel gave Bilhah to Jacob like a wife to bear him children. Bilhah gave birth to two sons, whom Rachel claimed as her own and named Dan and Naphtali.   expressly calls Bilhah Jacob's concubine, a pilegesh. When Leah saw that she had stopped having children, she took her servant Zilpah and gave her to Jacob like a wife to bear him children as well.

The apocryphal Testament of Naftali says that Bilhah and Zilpah's father was named Rotheus. He was taken into captivity but redeemed by Laban, Rachel and Leah's father. Laban gave Rotheus a wife named Euna, who was the girl's mother. On the other hand, the early rabbinical commentary Pirkei De-Rabbi Eliezer and other rabbinic sources (Midrash Rabba and elsewhere) state that Bilhah and Zilpah were also Laban's daughters, through his concubines, which would make them half-sisters to Rachel and Leah.

Bilhah is said to be buried in the Tomb of the Matriarchs in Tiberias.

In the Books of Chronicles, Shimei's brothers were said to have lived in a town called Bilhah and surrounding territories prior to the reign of David.

Reuben's adultery with Bilhah
Reuben was Jacob's (Israel) eldest son with Leah. Genesis 35:22 says, "And it came to pass, while Israel dwelt in that land, that Reuben went and lay with Bilhah his father's concubine; and Israel heard of it." As a result of this adultery, he lost the respect of his father, who said: "Unstable as water, have not thou the excellency; because thou wentest up to thy father's bed; then defiledst thou it—he went up to my couch."

Some rabbinical commentators interpreted the story differently, saying that Reuben's disruption of Bilhah's and Jacob's beds was not through sex with Bilhah. As long as Rachel was alive, say these commentators, Jacob kept his bed in her tent and visited the other wives in theirs. When Rachel died, Jacob moved his bed into the tent of Bilhah, who had been mentored by Rachel, to retain a closeness to his favourite wife. However, Reuben, Leah's eldest, felt that this move slighted his mother, who was also a primary wife, and so he moved Jacob's bed into his mother's tent and removed or overturned Bilhah's. This invasion of Jacob's privacy was viewed so gravely that the Bible equates it with adultery, and lost Reuben his first-born right to a double inheritance.

In popular culture
 In the novels The Red Tent by Anita Diamant and Rachel and Leah by Orson Scott Card, Bilhah and Zilpah are half-sisters of Leah and Rachel by different mothers, following the Talmudic tradition.
 In Margaret Atwood's speculative fiction novel The Handmaid's Tale, the theocratic society depicted cites the relationship between Bilhah, Rachel and Jacob as the basis for role of handmaids as surrogates to high-ranking men and their infertile wives.

References

Book of Genesis people
Jewish concubines
Jacob
Women in the Hebrew Bible
Slave concubines
Ancient slaves